Algebraic notation may refer to:

 In mathematics and computers, infix notation, the practice of representing a binary operator and operands with the operator between the two operands (as in "2 + 2")
 Algebraic notation (chess), the standard system for recording movement of pieces in a chess game
 In linguistics, recursive categorical syntax, also known as "algebraic syntax", a theory of how natural languages are structured
 Mathematical notation for algebra